The following is a list of awards and nominations received by Irish actor Paul Mescal. He gained recognition for his starring role in the miniseries Normal People (2020), for which he won a British Academy Television Award for Best Actor as well as a nomination for a Primetime Emmy Award for Outstanding Lead Actor in a Limited Series or Movie. Two years later, his performance in the independent drama film Aftersun (2022) earned him many nominations, including for the BAFTA and Academy Award for Best Actor.

Mescal has also received a nomination for the Laurence Olivier Award for Best Actor for his portrayal of Stanley Kowalski in the 2022 revival of the play A Streetcar Named Desire.

Major associations

Academy Awards

British Academy of Film and Television Arts Awards

British Independent Film Awards

Critics' Choice Awards

Primetime Emmy Awards

Independent Spirit Awards

Irish Film & Television Awards

Laurence Olivier Awards

Other associations

References

Mescal, Paul